The Angel of Pennsylvania Avenue is an American 1996 television film directed by Robert Ellis Miller, the last film Miller directed before his death on January 27, 2017. The film was completed days before actor Robert Urich had surgery for cancer.

Plot
During the Great Depression, an unemployed Detroit man is arrested for a crime he didn't commit, prompting his three children to travel over 500 miles to the White House in search of help from President Herbert Hoover in order to have their father home for Christmas.

Cast
Diana Scarwid as Annie Feagan
Robert Urich as Angus Feagan
Tegan Moss as Bernice Feagan
Britt Irvin as Lily Feagan
Alexander Pollock as Jack Feagan
 Camille Mitchell as Margaret
Thomas Peacocke as President Herbert Hoover

Production 
Filming took place in Vancouver, British Columbia during October and November 1996. Robert Urich had been diagnosed with synovial sarcoma in August 1996 and received treatments while filming was taking place; Ulrich had also completed a chemotherapy course just before he was approached to perform as Angus. Days after filming was completed Ulrich had surgery for the cancer.

Release 
The Angel of Pennsylvania Avenue premiered on The Family Channel on December 15, 1996. It was a co-production between the channel and Hallmark Entertainment.

Reception
Radio Times gave it 2 stars, saying "Cheesy dialogue and general overacting don't help matters, though it still warms the heart when the trio are finally given their audience with President Hoover."

See also
 List of Christmas films

References

External links

1996 television films
1996 films
1990s Christmas drama films
ABC Family original films
American Christmas drama films
Films about presidents of the United States
Films directed by Robert Ellis Miller
Great Depression films
Christmas television films
Cultural depictions of Herbert Hoover
1990s English-language films
1990s American films